The Holiness movement is a Christian movement that emerged chiefly within 19th-century Methodism, and to a lesser extent other traditions such as Quakerism, Anabaptism, and Restorationism. The movement is historically distinguished by its emphasis on the doctrine of a second work of grace, generally called entire sanctification or Christian perfection and by the belief that the Christian life should be free of sin. For the Holiness Movement "the term 'perfection' signifies completeness of Christian character; its freedom from all sin, and possession of all the graces of the Spirit, complete in kind." A number of evangelical Christian denominations, parachurch organizations, and movements emphasize those beliefs as central doctrine.

Beliefs

Entire sanctification 
The Holiness Movement believes that the "second work of grace" (or "second blessing") refers to a personal experience subsequent to regeneration, in which the believer is cleansed from original sin. It was actually this doctrine, the attainment of complete freedom from sin that the movement was built upon. "In this line of thinking, a person is first saved, at which point he is justified and born again. Following this, he experiences a period of growth...This ultimately culminates in a second work of grace whereby the Holy Spirit cleanses his heart of original sin, eradicating all inbred sin. The Holy Spirit then imparts His indwelling presence, empowering the believer...This is the baptism of the Holy Spirit. It happens instantaneously as the believer presents himself or herself as a living sacrifice to God with an attitude of full consecration," and faith. This was articulated in the founding documents of the Holiness Movement, the 1885 Declaration of Principles, which explained:"Entire Sanctification... is that great work wrought subsequent to regeneration, by the Holy Ghost, upon the sole condition of faith...such faith being preceded by an act of solemn and complete consecration. This work has these distinct elements:

 The entire extinction of the carnal mind, the total eradication of the birth principle of sin
 The communication of perfect love to the soul...
 The abiding indwelling of the Holy Ghost."The Church of the Nazarene, a large Wesleyan-Holiness denomination in the Methodist tradition, explains that:

According to Stephen S. White, a noted Holiness scholar from the mid-1900s, there are "five cardinal elements" in the doctrine of entire sanctification:

 "Entire Sanctification is a Second work of Grace
 Entire Sanctification is received Instantaneously
 Entire Sanctification -- Frees from Sin
 Entire Sanctification -- Is Attainable in This Life
 Entire Sanctification -- and the Baptism with the Holy Spirit are Simultaneous"

This experience of entire sanctification or Perfection is generally identified with the filling of or the baptism of the Holy Ghost. This doctrine is shared with traditional Methodism. John Swanel Inskip explained, "There is, however, one doctrine, in a great measure peculiar to Methodism. It is that, in which we teach the possibility of man attaining a state of grace in the present life, in which he will be made free from sin." Reflecting this inward holiness, Holiness Methodists, who make up the bulk of the Holiness Movement, have emphasized the Wesleyan-Arminian doctrine outward holiness, which includes practices such as the wearing of modest clothing and not using profanity in speech; Holiness Quakers have likewise emphasized the Friends teaching on testimony of simplicity, while the Holiness Anabaptists (such as Holiness River Brethren and Holiness Mennonites) have upheld their belief in nonconformity to the world. Baptists who have embraced the second work of grace have founded their own denominations, such as the Holiness Baptist Association and Ohio Valley Association of the Christian Baptist Churches of God.

Definition of sin 
Holiness adherents also hold to a distinctive definition of (actual) sin. They believe that "only conscious sins are truly sins." Historian Charles Jones, explains  “Believing that sin was conscious disobedience to a known law of God, holiness believers were convinced that the true Christian, having repented of every known act of sin, did not and could not willfully sin again and remain a Christian.”  Historian Benjamin Pettit describes the approach of the Wesleyan-Holiness movement as: 1.              “The person who sins is not a Christian but a sinner.

2.              When a person is saved, he is out of the sin business (may but must not sin)

3.              The sinner must repent and be restored to his lost relationship with God.

4.              To sin results in spiritual death.”In his study of this question Caleb Black concludes that "the consensus understanding of sin in the Holiness tradition is that sin is an avoidable, voluntary, morally responsible act that those born of God do not commit." Put simply Holiness adherents adhere to the definition of sin, as explained by Wesley himself. "Nothing is sin, strictly speaking, but a voluntary transgression of a known law of God. Therefore, every voluntary breach of the law of love is sin; and nothing else, if we speak properly. To strain the matter farther is only to make way for Calvinism." Dr. Timothy Cooley explains "If this definition is compromised, victorious Christian living becomes meaningless, and entire sanctification an impossibility.” "The definition and consequences of sin are a key theological distinctive of the Holiness Movement as it underlies their entire theological system. To differ on the conception of sin is to destroy the foundation of holiness theology."

With this definition of sin, Holiness adherents believe while Christians may fall into sin, they also have the God-given power to avoid committing sin, and in this sense be free from sin. Furthermore, not only does God enable this obedience he also requires it. One of the founders of the movement, J. A. Wood, explains "The lowest type of a Christian sinneth not, and is not condemned. The minimum of salvation is salvation from sinning. The maximum is salvation from pollution -- the inclination to sin." Another founder, C. J. Fowler explains that "We teach that regeneration does not allow the committing of conscious sin." Harry Jessop warns "It should ever be born in mind that believers cannot commit sin without forfeiting justification." The founder of the Church of God (Anderson, Indiana), D. S. Warner, explains "Holiness writers and teachers, as far as my knowledge extends, uniformly hold up a sinless life, as the true test and Bible standard of regeneration." This doctrine follows in the footsteps of Wesley who wrote “If a believer wilfully sins, he casts away his faith. Neither is it possible he should have justifying faith again, without previously repenting."

Lifestyle 
Holiness groups believe the moral aspects of the law of God are pertinent for today, and expect their adherents to obey behavioral rules.  Consequently, members of the Holiness movement readily apply Scriptural lifestyle commands to their lives, and view them as generally binding today, and apply these principles in numerous different ways.  "Holiness churches have been distinguished from other churches by their more careful lifestyle. Many churches and denominations in the Holiness movement prohibit smoking, drinking, dancing, listening to inappropriate worldly music, or wearing makeup or flashy clothes."

History

Roots 
Though it became a multi-denominational movement over time and was furthered by the Second Great Awakening which energized churches of all stripes, the bulk of Holiness movement has its roots in John Wesley and Methodism.

Early Methodism
The Holiness movement traces their roots back to John Wesley, Charles Wesley, John Fletcher, and the Methodists of the 18th century. The Methodists of the 19th century continued the interest in Christian holiness that had been started by their founder, John Wesley in England. They continued to publish Wesley's works and tracts, including his famous A Plain Account of Christian Perfection. From 1788 to 1808, the entire text of A Plain Account was placed in the Discipline manual of the Methodist Episcopal Church (U.S.), and numerous persons in early American Methodism professed the experience of entire sanctification, including Bishop Francis Asbury. The Methodists during this period placed a strong emphasis on holy living, and their concept of entire sanctification.

Second Great Awakening

By the 1840s, a new emphasis on Holiness and Christian perfection began within American Methodism, brought about in large part by the revivalism and camp meetings of the Second Great Awakening (1790–1840).

Two major Holiness leaders during this period were Methodist preacher Phoebe Palmer and her husband, Dr. Walter Palmer. In 1835, Palmer's sister, Sarah A. Lankford, started holding Tuesday Meetings for the Promotion of Holiness in her New York City home. In 1837, Palmer experienced what she called entire sanctification and had become the leader of the Tuesday Meetings by 1839. At first only women attended these meetings, but eventually Methodist bishops and hundreds of clergy and laymen began to attend as well. At the same time, Methodist minister Timothy Merritt of Boston founded a journal called the Guide to Christian Perfection, later renamed The Guide to Holiness. This was the first American periodical dedicated exclusively to promoting the doctrine of Christian holiness. In 1865, the Palmers purchased The Guide which at its peak had a circulation of 30,000. In New York City, Palmer met with Amanda Smith, a preacher in the African Methodist Episcopal Church who testified that she became entirely sanctified in 1868 and then began to preach Christian holiness throughout the world.

Also representative was the revivalism of Rev. James Caughey, an American missionary sent by the Wesleyan Methodist Church to work in Ontario, Canada from the 1840s through 1864. He brought in the converts by the score, most notably in the revivals in Canada West 1851–53. His technique combined restrained emotionalism with a clear call for personal commitment, thus bridging the rural style of camp meetings and the expectations of more "sophisticated" Methodist congregations in the emerging cities. Phoebe Palmer's ministry complemented Caughey's revivals in Ontario circa 1857. Jarena Lee of the African Methodist Episcopal Church and Julia A. J. Foote of the African Methodist Episcopal Zion Church aligned themselves with the Wesleyan-Holiness movement and preached the doctrine of entire sanctification throughout the pulpits of their connexions.

While many holiness proponents stayed in the mainline Methodist Churches, such as Henry Clay Morrison who became president of Asbury College and Theological Seminary, at least two major Holiness Methodist denominations broke away from mainline Methodism during this period. In 1843, Orange Scott organized the Wesleyan Methodist Connection (an antecedent of the Wesleyan Church, as well as the Allegheny Wesleyan Methodist Connection and the Bible Methodist Connection of Churches) at Utica, New York. The major reason for the foundation of the Wesleyan Methodist Church was their emphasis on the abolition of slavery. In 1860, B.T. Roberts and John Wesley Redfield founded the Free Methodist Church on the ideals of slavery abolition, egalitarianism, and second-blessing holiness. In 1900, the Lumber River Conference of the Holiness Methodist Church was organized to minister to Native Americans, especially the Lumbee tribe. Advocacy for the poor remained a hallmark of these and other Methodist offshoots. Some of these offshoots would currently be more specifically identified as part of the Conservative holiness movement, a group that would represent the more conservative branch of the movement.

At the Tuesday Meetings, Methodists soon enjoyed fellowship with Christians of different denominations, including the Congregationalist Thomas Upham. Upham was the first man to attend the meetings, and his participation in them led him to study mystical experiences, looking to find precursors of Holiness teaching in the writings of persons like German Pietist Johann Arndt and the Roman Catholic mystic Madame Guyon.

Other non-Methodists also contributed to the Holiness movement in the U.S. and in England. "New School" Calvinists such as Asa Mahan, the first president of Oberlin College, and Charles Grandison Finney, an evangelist associated with the college and later its second president, promoted the idea of Christian holiness and slavery abolition (which Wesleyan Methodists also supported). In 1836, Mahan experienced what he called a baptism with the Holy Spirit. Mahan believed that this experience had cleansed him from the desire and inclination to sin. Finney believed that this experience might provide a solution to a problem he observed during his evangelistic revivals. Some people claimed to experience conversion but then slipped back into their old ways of living. Finney believed that the filling with the Holy Spirit could help these converts to continue steadfast in their Christian life. This phase of the Holiness movement is often referred to as the Oberlin-Holiness revival.

Presbyterian William Boardman promoted the idea of Holiness through his evangelistic campaigns and through his book The Higher Christian Life, which was published in 1858, which was a zenith point in Holiness activity prior to a lull brought on by the American Civil War.

Many adherents of the Religious Society of Friends (Quakers) stressed George Fox's doctrine of Perfectionism (which is analogous to the Methodist doctrine of entire sanctification). These Holiness Quakers formed Yearly Meetings such as the Central Yearly Meeting of Friends. Around the same period, Hannah Whitall Smith, an English Quaker, experienced a profound personal conversion. Sometime in the 1860s, she found what she called the "secret" of the Christian life—devoting one's life wholly to God and God's simultaneous transformation of one's soul. Her husband, Robert Pearsall Smith, had a similar experience at the camp meeting in 1867. The couple became figureheads in the now-famous Keswick Convention that gave rise to what is often called the Keswick-Holiness revival, which became distinct from the holiness movement.

Among Anabaptists, the Brethren in Christ Church (as well as the Calvary Holiness Church that later split from it) emerged in Lancaster County as a denomination of River Brethren who adopted Radical Pietistic teaching, which "emphasized spiritual passion and a warm, personal relationship to Jesus Christ." They teach "the necessity of a crisis-conversion experience" as well as the existence of a second work of grace that "results in the believer resulting in the ability to say no to sin". These Holiness Anabaptist denominations emphasize the wearing of a headcovering by women, plain dress, temperance, footwashing, and pacifism. Founded by Samuel Heinrich Fröhlich, the Apostolic Christian Church (Nazarene) is an Anabaptist denomination aligned with the holiness movement, thus being "distinguished by its emphasis on entire sanctifiation". Mennonites who were impacted by Radical Pietism and the teaching of holiness founded the Missionary Church, a holiness church in the Anabaptist tradition.

General Baptists who embraced belief in the second work of grace established their own denominations, such as the Holiness Baptist Association (founded in 1894) and the Ohio Valley Association of the Christian Baptist Churches of God (formed in 1931).

Post-Civil War
Following the American Civil War, many Holiness proponents—most of them Methodists—became nostalgic for the heyday of camp meeting revivalism during the Second Great Awakening.

The first distinct "Holiness camp meeting" convened at Vineland, New Jersey in 1867 under the leadership of John Swanel Inskip, John A. Wood, Alfred Cookman, and other Methodist ministers. The gathering attracted as many as 10,000 people. At the close of the encampment, while the ministers were on their knees in prayer, they formed the National Camp Meeting Association for the Promotion of Holiness, and agreed to conduct a similar gathering the next year. This organization was commonly known as the National Holiness Association. Later, it became known as the Christian Holiness Association and subsequently the Christian Holiness Partnership The second National Camp Meeting was held at Manheim, Pennsylvania, and drew upwards of 25,000 persons from all over the nation. People called it a "Pentecost." The service on Monday evening has almost become legendary for its spiritual power and influence. The third National Camp Meeting met at Round Lake, New York. This time the national press attended and write-ups appeared in numerous papers, including a large two-page pictorial in Harper's Weekly. These meetings made instant religious celebrities out of many of the workers. "By the 1880s holiness was the most powerful doctrinal movement in America and seemed to be carrying away all opposition both within the Methodist Church and was quickly spreading throughout many other denominations." This however, was not without objection."The leaders of the National Camp Meeting Association for the Promotion of Holiness generally opposed “come-outism,”...They urged believers in entire sanctification and Christian perfection to remain in their denominations and to work within them to promote holiness teaching and general spiritual vitality."

Though distinct from the mainstream Holiness movement, the fervor of the Keswick-Holiness revival in the 1870s swept Great Britain, where it was sometimes called the higher life movement after the title of William Boardman's book The Higher Life. Higher life conferences were held at Broadlands and Oxford in 1874 and in Brighton and Keswick in 1875. The Keswick Convention soon became the British headquarters for this movement. The Faith Mission in Scotland was another consequence of the British Holiness movement. Another was a flow of influence from Britain back to the United States: In 1874, Albert Benjamin Simpson read Boardman's Higher Christian Life and felt the need for such a life himself. Simpson went on to found the Christian and Missionary Alliance.

American Holiness associations began to form as an outgrowth of this new wave of camp meetings, such as the Western Holiness Association—first of the regional associations that prefigured "come-outism"—formed at Bloomington, Illinois. In 1877, several "general holiness conventions" met in Cincinnati and New York City.

In 1871, the American evangelist Dwight L. Moody had what he called an "endowment with power" as a result of some soul-searching and the prayers of two Free Methodist women who attended one of his meetings. He did not join the Wesleyan-Holiness movement but maintained a belief in progressive sanctification which his theological descendants still hold to.

While the great majority of Holiness proponents remained within the three major denominations of the mainline Methodist church, Holiness people from other theological traditions established standalone bodies. In 1881, D. S. Warner started the Evening Light Reformation, out of which was formed the Church of God (Anderson, Indiana), bringing Restorationism to the Holiness family. The Church of God Reformation Movement held that "interracial worship was a sign of the true Church", with both whites and blacks ministering regularly in Church of God congregations, which invited people of all races to worship there. Those who were entirely sanctified testified that they were "saved, sanctified, and prejudice removed." Though outsiders would sometimes attack Church of God services and camp meetings for their stand for racial equality, Church of God members were "undeterred even by violence" and "maintained their strong interracial position as the core of their message of the unity of all believers". In the 1890s, Edwin Harvey and Marmaduke Mendenhall Farson started the Metropolitan Methodist Mission which became known as the Metropolitan Church Association; it taught communal living, holding that "material possessions could be idols that might threaten one's sanctification experience" and that "while people who do not have the Holy Spirit may give, those who do give all."

Palmer's The Promise of the Father, published in 1859, which argued in favor of women in ministry, later influenced Catherine Booth, co-founder of the Salvation Army (the practice of ministry by women is common but not universal within the denominations of the Holiness movement). The founding of the Salvation Army in 1878 helped to rekindle Holiness sentiment in the cradle of Methodism—a fire kept lit by Primitive Methodists and other British descendants of Wesley and George Whitefield in prior decades.

Overseas missions emerged as a central focus of the Holiness people. As one example of this world evangelism thrust, Pilgrim Holiness Church founder Martin Wells Knapp (who also founded the Revivalist in 1883, the Pentecostal Revival League and Prayer League, the Central Holiness League 1893, the International Holiness Union and Prayer League, and God's Bible School and College), saw much success in Korea, Japan, China, India, South Africa and South America. Methodist mission work in Japan led to the creation of the One Mission Society, one of the largest missionary-sending Holiness agencies in the world.

Wesleyan realignment

Though many Holiness preachers, camp meeting leaders, authors, and periodical editors were Methodists, this was not universally popular with Methodist leadership. Out of the four million Methodists in the United States during the 1890s, probably one-third to one-half were committed to the idea of entire sanctification as being brought about instantaneously. Notable scholar Daniel Whedon famously stated "they are not Wesleyan. We believe that a living Wesley would never admit them to the Methodist system.” Proponents of the Holiness Movement however, fiercely resisted this accusation, and defended their doctrine from Wesley's own words. One of the founders of the camp meeting association, J. A. Wood, defended his doctrine with an extensive survey of Wesley's doctrine of Christian Perfection, entitled Christian Perfection as Taught by John Wesley. In this book he spent several hundred pages exclusively quoting Wesley in defense of the Holiness Movement's view of entire sanctification. In fact the Holiness Movement was able to defend it's doctrine so well that historian Melvin Dieter comments that "The holiness movement was 'so closely identified with traditional Methodism and Wesleyan doctrine and life that Methodist opponents of the revival were forced to distance themselves from Wesley and the standard authors of prevailing Methodist theology to re-solve the struggle with the holiness elements within the church.'" Even still "The leaders of the National Camp Meeting Association for the Promotion of Holiness generally opposed “come-outism,”...They urged believers in entire sanctification and Christian perfection to remain in their denominations and to work within them to promote holiness teaching and general spiritual vitality."

Southern Methodist minister B. F. Haynes wrote in his book, Tempest-Tossed on Methodist Seas, about his decision to leave the Methodist church and join what would become Church of the Nazarene. In it, he described the bitter divisions within the Methodist church over the Holiness movement, including verbal assaults made on Holiness movement proponents at the 1894 conference. This tension reached a head at the 1898 conference of the Methodist Episcopal Church, South, when it passed rule 301:

Many Holiness evangelists and traveling ministers found it difficult to continue their ministry under this new rule—particularly in mainline Methodist charges and circuits that were unfriendly to the Holiness movement. In the years that followed, scores of new Holiness Methodist associations were formed -- many of these "come-outer" associations and various parties alienated by Mainline Methodism consolidated to form new denominations (e.g. the Free Methodist Church, the Wesleyan Methodist Church, the Salvation Army and the Church of the Nazarene).

Other Holiness Methodists (the “stay-inners”) remained within the mainline Methodist Churches, such as H. C. Morrison who became the first president of Asbury Theological Seminary, a prominent university of the holiness movement that remains influential among holiness adherents in mainline Methodism.

Those who left mainline Methodist churches to form Holiness denominations during this time numbered no more than 100,000.

Early 20th century

Throughout the early 20th century, week-long revival campaigns with local churches (and revival elements brought into the worship service) carried on the tradition of camp meetings.

Pentecostalism and the Charismatic movement competed for the loyalties of Holiness advocates (see related section below), and a separate Pentecostal-Holiness movement was born. This new dichotomy gradually dwindled the population of the mainstream of the Holiness movement.

Some Holiness advocates found themselves at home with Fundamentalism and later the Evangelical movement. It was during this time (1939) that the Methodist Episcopal Church (North and South) and the Methodist Protestant Church merged to form The Methodist Church. This merger created a Mainline Christian organization which made remaining Holiness elements within U.S. Methodism less influential.

Mid-to-late 20th century

Cultural shifts following World War II resulted in a further division in the Holiness movement.

Not content with what they considered to be a lax attitude toward sin, several small groups left Holiness denominations of the Methodist tradition, and to a lesser extent Quaker, Anabaptist and Restorationist denominations, to form the conservative holiness movement. Staunch defenders of Biblical inerrancy, they stress modesty in dress and revivalistic worship practices. They identify with classical Fundamentalism more so than Evangelicalism. While some have pointed out that the broader holiness movement has declined in its original strong emphasis of the doctrine of entire sanctification, the conservative holiness movement still frequently promotes, preaches, and teaches this definition of holiness and entire sanctification, both at the scholarly level, and in pastoral teaching.

As the Holiness Conservatives were distancing themselves even further, Mainline Methodism was becoming larger with the merger between The Methodist Church and the Evangelical United Brethren Church, forming the United Methodist Church in 1968. A slow trickle of disaffected Holiness-friendly United Methodists left for Holiness movement denominations, while other Holiness advocates stayed in the United Methodist Church and are represented in the Good News Movement and Confessing Movement. Many United Methodist clergy in the holiness tradition are educated at Asbury Theological Seminary.

Meanwhile, the bulk of the Wesleyan-Holiness churches began to developed a disdain for what they considered to be legalism, and gradually dropped prohibitions against dancing and theater patronage, while maintaining rules against gambling, as well as alcohol and tobacco use. Continued stances on the sanctity of marriage and abstinence matched similar convictions. In the 1970s, opposition to abortion became a recurring theme, and by the 1990s statements against practicing homosexuality were increasingly common. A devotion to charity work continued, particularly through the Salvation Army and other denominational and parachurch agencies.

21st century

Faced with a growing identity crisis and continually dwindling numbers, Wesleyan-Holiness Evangelicals have hosted several inter-denominational conferences and begun several initiatives to draw a clearer distinction between Wesleyan theology and that of other Evangelicals and to explore how to address contemporary social issues and appear winsome to a "post-modern world." As one such example, in 2006 the Wesleyan Holiness Consortium published "The Holiness Manifesto" in conjunction with representatives from historic Holiness Methodist denominations, including the Free Methodist Church, United Methodist Church, Wesleyan Church, and the Church of the Nazarene.

The divide between classical Fundamentalism and Evangelicalism became greater following the 9/11 terrorist attacks on the U.S. by militant Muslim fundamentalists—as the term "fundamental" became associated with intolerance and aggressive attitudes. Several Evangelical Holiness groups and publications have denounced the term "fundamentalist" (preferring Evangelical) while others are reconciling to what extent the Fundamentalist movement of the 1920s remains a part of their history.

The Church of the Nazarene, the Wesleyan Church, and the Free Methodist Church were the largest Wesleyan-Evangelical Holiness bodies as of 2015. Talks of a merger were tabled, but new cooperatives such as the Global Wesleyan Alliance were formed as the result of inter-denominational meetings.

The Global Methodist Church is expected to consist of a large number of traditionalists, including those aligned with the Wesleyan-Holiness movement, once a separation agreement is reached by United Methodist Church leadership and conference delegates in 2022 or later. The Book of Discipline of the Global Methodist Church thus teaches that "a life of holiness or 'entire sanctification' should be the goal of each individual’s journey with God."

At this point the legacy of the Holiness Movement is fragmented between the more conservative branch, attempting to maintain and revive historic Holiness doctrine and practice, and others more willing to move beyond the doctrine and tradition of the past.

Influences

The main roots of the Holiness movement are as follows:

 The Reformation itself, with its emphasis on salvation by grace through faith alone.
 Puritanism in 17th-century England and its transplantation to America with its emphasis on adherence to the Bible and the right to dissent from the established church.
 Pietism in 17th-century Germany, led by Philipp Jakob Spener, as well as the Moravians, both of whom emphasized the spiritual life of the individual, coupled with a responsibility to live an upright life.
 Quietism, as taught by the Religious Society of Friends (Quakers), with its emphasis on the individual's ability to experience God and understand God's will for himself.
 The 1730s Evangelical Revival in England, led by Methodists John Wesley and his brother Charles Wesley, which introduced the concept of Entire Sanctification and certain teachings of German Pietism to England and eventually to the United States.
 The First Great Awakening in the 18th and early 19th centuries in the United States, propagated by George Whitefield, Jonathan Edwards, and others, with its emphasis on the initial conversion experience of Christians.
 The Second Great Awakening in the 19th century in the United States, propagated by Francis Asbury, Charles Finney, Lyman Beecher, Phoebe Palmer and others, which also emphasized the need for personal holiness and is characterized by the rise of evangelistic revival meetings.

Relation and reaction to Pentecostalism
The traditional Holiness movement is distinct from the Pentecostal movement, which believes that the baptism in the Holy Spirit involves supernatural manifestations such as speaking in unknown tongues. Many of the early Pentecostals originated from the Holiness movement, and to this day many "classical Pentecostals" maintain much of Holiness doctrine and many of its devotional practices. Several of its denominations include the word "Holiness" in their names, including the Pentecostal Holiness Church.

The terms pentecostal and apostolic, now used by adherents to Pentecostal and charismatic doctrine, were once widely used by Holiness churches in connection with the consecrated lifestyle they see described in the New Testament.

During the Azusa Street Revival (often considered the advent of Pentecostalism), the practice of speaking in tongues was strongly rejected by leaders of the traditional Holiness movement. Alma White, the leader of the Pillar of Fire Church, a Holiness denomination, wrote a book against the Pentecostal movement that was published in 1936; the work, entitled Demons and Tongues, represented early rejection of the tongues-speaking Pentecostal movement. White called speaking in tongues "satanic gibberish" and Pentecostal services "the climax of demon worship". However, many contemporary Holiness churches now believe in the legitimacy of speaking in unknown tongues, but not as a sign of entire sanctification as classical Pentecostals still teach.

There are an estimated 78 million classical Pentecostals, and 510 million assorted Charismatics who share a heritage or common beliefs with the Pentecostal movement. If the Holiness movement and Pentecostal/Charismatic Christians were counted together the total population would be around 600 million.

Denominations and associations

Several organizations and programs exist to promote the Holiness movement, plan missions, and promote ecumenism among churches:
 Christian Holiness Partnership
 Interchurch Holiness Convention
 Global Wesleyan Alliance
 Holiness Unto the Lord
 Worldwide Faith Missions
 One Mission Society
 Wesleyan Holiness Consortium
 World Gospel Mission
Wesleyan Holiness Women Clergy

The Holiness movement led to the formation and further development of several Christian denominations and associations. Below are denominations which historically have substantially adhered to Holiness movement doctrine (excluding Conservative Holiness movement and distinctively Holiness Pentecostal bodies).

 Association of Independent Methodists
 Apostolic Christian Church (Nazarene)
 Bible Missionary Church
 Brethren in Christ Church
 Christ's Sanctified Holy Church
 The Church of the Nazarene
 Church of Christ Holiness (USA)
 Churches of Christ in Christian Union
 Church of Daniel's Band 
 Church of God (Anderson) 
 Congregational Methodist Church 
 Evangelical Christian Church 
 Evangelical Church of North America 
 Evangelical Friends Church International-Eastern Region
 Evangelical Methodist Church 
 Free Methodist Church
 Freewill Baptists (certain congregations) 
 Global Methodist Church
 God's Missionary Church 
 Immanuel General Mission (Japan)
 International Fellowship of Bible Churches
 Kentucky Mountain Holiness Association
 Korea Evangelical Holiness Church
 Korea Jesus Holiness Sungkyul Church
 Korea Holiness Church of the Nazarene
 Korea Church of God
 Korea Evangelical Church of America
 Lumber River Conference of the Holiness Methodist Church
 Metropolitan Church Association
 Missionary Church (North-Central District and others) 
 Missionary Methodist Church
 National Association of Wesleyan Evangelicals
 Ohio Valley Association of the Christian Baptist Churches of God
 Pillar of Fire International
 Primitive Methodist Church 
 The Salvation Army
 Southern Baptist Convention (certain congregations and associations)
 Southern Congregational Methodist Church
 United Holiness Church of Jesus Christ
 United Methodist Church (certain districts and local churches, as well as universities)
 The Wesleyan Church
 Wesleyan Nazarene Church

Colleges, Bible schools, and universities

Many institutions of higher learning exist to promote Holiness ideas, as well as to provide a liberal arts education.

See also

 Arminianism
 Theosis (Eastern Orthodox theology)

References

Notes

Citations

Primary sources

 McDonald, William and John E. Searles. The Life of Rev. John S. Inskip, President of the National Association for the Promotion of Holiness (Chicago: The Christian Witness Co., 1885).

 Smith, Hannah Whitall. The Unselfishness of God, and How I Discovered It: A Spiritual Autobiography (New York: Fleming H. Resell Co., 1903).

Further reading

 Boardman, William E. The Higher Christian Life, (Boston: Henry Hoyt, 1858).
 Brown, Kenneth O. Holy Ground, Too, The Camp Meeting Family Tree. Hazleton: Holiness Archives, 1997.
 Brown, Kenneth O. Inskip, McDonald, Fowler: "Wholly And Forever Thine." (Hazleton: Holiness Archives, 2000.)
 Cunningham, Floyd. T. " Holiness Abroad: Nazarene Missions in Asia. " Pietist and Wesleyan Studies, No. 16. Lanham, MD: Scarecrow Press, 2003.
 Cunningham, Floyd T. ed. "Our Watchword & Song: The Centennial History of the Church of the Nazarene." By Floyd T. Cunningham; Stan Ingersol; Harold E. Raser; and David P. Whitelaw. Kansas City, MO: Beacon Hill Press of Kansas City, 2009.
 Dieter, Melvin E. The Holiness Revival of the Nineteenth Century (Rowman & Littlefield, 1996).
 Grider, J. Kenneth. A Wesleyan-Holiness Theology, 1994.
 Kostlevy, William C., ed. Historical Dictionary of the Holiness Movement (Rowman & Littlefield, 2001).
 Kostlevy, William C. Holy Jumpers: Evangelicals and Radicals in Progressive Era America (2010) on the influential Metropolitan Church Association in 1890s Chicago excerpt and text search
 Mannoia, Kevin W. and Don Thorsen. "The Holiness Manifesto", (William B. Eerdmans Publishing, 2008)
 Sanders, Cheryl J. Saints in Exile: The Holiness-Pentecostal Experience in African American Religion and Culture (Oxford University Press, 1999)
 Smith, Logan Pearsall, ed. Philadelphia Quaker: The Letters of Hannah Whitall Smith (New York: Harcourt, Brace and Co., 1950).
 Smith, Timothy L. Called Unto Holiness: The Story of the Nazarenes—The Formative Years, (Nazarene Publishing House, 1962).
 Spencer, Carol. Holiness: The Soul Of Quakerism" (Paternoster. Milton Keynes, 2007)
 Stephens, Randall J. The Fire Spreads: Holiness and Pentecostalism in the American South." (Cambridge, MA: Harvard University Press, 2008).
 Thornton, Wallace Jr.   The Conservative Holiness Movement: A Historical Appraisal, 2014 excerpt and text search
 Thornton, Wallace Jr. When the Fire Fell: Martin Wells Knapp's Vision of Pentecostal and the Beginnings of God's Bible School " (Emeth Press, 2014).
 Thornton, Wallace Jr. From Glory to Glory: A Brief Summary of Holiness Beliefs and Practices Thornton, Wallace Jr. Radical Righteousness: Personal Ethics and the Development of the Holiness Movement White, Charles Edward. The Beauty of Holiness: Phoebe Palmer as Theologian, Revivalist, Feminist, and Humanitarian (Zondervan/Francis Asbury Press, 1986).

External links
 Holiness Movement (Conservative Holiness Movement directory)
 CHB (Conservative Holiness Movement Internet Radio)
 Holiness history from the Global Anabaptist Mennonite Encyclopedia Online
 "The Cleansing Wave", article from Christianity Today "Holiness Movement: Dead or Alive," article by Keith Drury (CRI Voice)''
 Christian Cyclopedia article on Holiness Churches
 Five Cardinal Elements in the Doctrine of Entire Sanctification

 
Christian terminology
Christian revivals
Evangelical movement
Quaker theology